FinTech Association of Sri Lanka (FASL) is an independent, not-for-profit, and cross-industry organisation representing Sri Lankan and global FinTech community to support the development, innovation and investment in the FinTech sector.

FASL is closely collaborating with Central Bank of Sri Lanka (CBSL) on fintech related issues; and a number of fintech events related to FASL were represented by CBSL.

History
Establishing ‘Fintech Association of Sri Lanka’ was initiated at the ‘Fintech Meetup’ of the ‘Asia-Pacific Executives Forum’ which was held at Hilton Colombo in 2018; where Central Bank of Sri Lanka Assistant Governor also participated and delivered a speech on regulatory role of Central Bank on Fintech.

Governance
FASL is governed by an executive committee that consists of a president, vice president, general secretary and other committee members. The executive committee is advised by an advisory board consists of industry experts.

Collaborations and joint initiatives

 FASL is an MoU-signed partner of the Fintech Associations in Singapore, Hong Kong, Japan, the Philippines, etc. and ASEAN Financial Innovation Network.

 FASL was a community partner, supporter institution or regional co-organiser for various fintech summits in the region including Shanghai, Singapore, Hong Kong, Vietnam, Mumbai, Dubai, Colombo including Singapore FinTech Festival, Hong Kong FinTech Week and Asia Smart App Awards.

 FASL partnered a fintech seminar, hosted by The University of Hong Kong.

 FASL organised regular Fintech workshops (based on HKU FinTech of The University of Hong Kong) at Hilton Colombo.

 FASL organised ‘Lithuanian fintech meetup’ in Colombo in collaboration with the Lithuanian Embassy in New Delhi and HatchX, a fintech accelerator in Sri Lanka.

See also
 Central Bank of Sri Lanka (CBSL)

References

External links
Official website

Professional associations based in Sri Lanka
Learned societies of Sri Lanka
Organizations established in 2018
Financial technology
Financial markets
Financial services
Technology in society
Financial services organizations